was a Japanese photographer. He served as a senior director of the Photographic Society of Japan and received a Distinguished Contribution award from the Photographic Society of Japan awards in 1965. He also served as chairman of the Tokyo Photographic Research Association (:ja:東京写真研究会).

References

Japanese photographers
1900 births
1995 deaths